Kiveton Park Football Club is a football club based in Kiveton Park, South Yorkshire, England.

History
Although a team representing the village played two games with a side from Anston during the 1877–78 season, Kiveton Park FC was not formed until 1881. Two years later, the club affiliated with the Sheffield Football Association. Its first club colours were believed to be red and black quarters.

In 1891–92 they were founder members of the Sheffield & District Football League (being Chesterfield F.C.'s first ever league opponents on the first day of that season) and lifted their first trophy after beating Sheepbridge in the final of the Sheffield Minor Cup.

For 1893–94 the Minor Cup changed from a knockout competition to a league, and Kiveton moved to join, also entering the Hatchard League at the same time. They were the first winners of the latter in 1894 and repeated the success two years later, remaining in the competition until the outbreak of the First World War.

Kiveton spent the majority of the time between the two world wars in the Sheffield Amateur League, with the exception of brief spells in the Sheffield Association League and the Holbrook & District League. They made their FA Cup debut in 1920, and reached the 3rd qualifying round of the competition two years later, losing to Rotherham Town at Clifton Lane.

The club, like most others in the country, did initially break up when the Second World War broke out, but in 1942 they joined the Worksop & District League, remaining in this competition until the end of the war. The 1945–46 season saw the club come close to winning two prestigious competitions – going out in the semi-finals of the Sheffield & Hallamshire Senior Cup and finishing as runners-up in the Sheffield Invitation League play-offs, after beating Sheffield United reserves in the semi-final at Hard Lane.

They spent the first four post-war years as Kiveton Park Colliery in the Sheffield Association League, before joining the Yorkshire League in 1949. After suffering two disastrous campaigns at this higher level, they moved back to the Worksop & District League, where they were renamed as Kiveton Park United. They stayed in Worksop football until 1959, when they moved to the East Derbyshire League, and before long they were finding great success - in the 1961–62 season they won seven trophies. In 1963 the club successfully applied to re-join the Yorkshire League, and was accepted by the name of Kiveton Park.

In 1967 they won promotion to Division One and two years later finished in third place – the club's highest ever league finish.
 A year later however they were relegated back to Division Two. In 1972 they completed a league and cup double, winning the prestigious Sheffield & Hallamshire Senior Cup for the first time, and gaining promotion back to the Yorkshire League's top flight. Their yo-yo existence would continue however – up to 1982 they flitted constantly between Division One and Two, winning the Division Two title in 1978.

A year after Kiveton reached the 4th Round of the FA Vase in 1981, the Yorkshire League merged with the Midland League to form the Northern Counties East League (NCEL), and Park were among the founder members of the new competition. They spent the first three years in Division Two South before being moved to Division One South when the competition went through a restructure in 1985, a year after the club's reserve team had won the last ever Wharncliffe Charity Cup final. They were promoted to Division One in 1986, but were relegated back again in 1990 because of ground grading issues. At the end of the 1990–91 season they left the NCEL to join the Central Midlands League (CMFL)

Park finished as Premier Division North runners-up in their first season, and a year later won promotion to the CMFL's Supreme Division. In 1994 the village's colliery closed, and two years later, after losing its biggest financier, the club went into hibernation. The club was reformed in 1999, re-joining the CMFL Premier Division. In 2003 they finished as runners-up, gaining promotion back to the Supreme Division, but were relegated back again two years later because of their failure to install floodlights. This blow came just days after they had won the Sheffield & Hallamshire Association Cup for the second year running. It wasn't until the league restructured in 2011 to form North and South divisions that the club regained Step 7 status in the English football league system.

In 2013 the club decided, due to the cost of travelling to away games, to leave the CMFL, and join the more local Sheffield & Hallamshire County Senior Football League (S&HCSL). Kiveton entered the Second Division of the S&HCSL for the start of the 2013–14 season. After years in Division Two, Park won promotion to Division One of the S&HCSL in 2017; the same year that the club left its Hard Lane home of nearly a century to move to the playing fields of Wales High School.

Season-by-season record

Managers

Notable former players

Kiveton's most famous sons, Harry and Herbert Chapman, played for the club before going onto greater things – Harry became a Sheffield Wednesday legend while Herbert went on to become one of the most successful managers of all time. In 2004 the Sunday Times voted Herbert the greatest British manager ever, and in 2014 the club featured prominently in Patrick Barclay's book – The Life and Times of Herbert Chapman. Barclay wrote: "Kiveton Park could claim to have been a cradle of two revolutions, one industrial and the other sporting, and beyond question it is the birthplace of at least one great man, widely considered the father of football as we have come to know it."

Although Harry Chapman could claim to be the best player to hail from the village, he never won an international cap – although another Kivetonian did. Bert Morley played for England against Ireland in 1910, just six years after leaving his local football team.

In 1940, Empire News reported that, pro rata, the village had turned out more professional football players than anywhere in England apart from the Shropshire town of Oakengates.

Grounds
The club's first home was a ground near Kiveton Park station, and they also played on pitches at Wales Cricket Club (which was destroyed to make room for the M1 motorway in 1960), and Torquilstone (near the site of the destroyed Kiveton Hall on the road to Todwick) during their early years.

After the First World War, the club moved to a ground on Hard Lane - paid for by the local Miners Welfare scheme - that also hosted the village's cricket club. Initially Park played on the pitch nearest Hard Lane, but in the 1960s they moved to the central pitch and built a stand to hold 200 seated spectators. In 2017, they left Hard Lane after nearly a century - moving to the playing fields of Wales High School.

Gallery

Honours

League
Hatchard League
Champions: 1893–94, 1895–96
Yorkshire League Division 2
Promoted: 1965–66, 1971–72, 1977–78 (champions), 1979–80
Northern Counties East League Division 2
Promoted: 1986-86
Central Midlands Football League Premier Division
Promoted: 1992–93, 2002–03
Portland Senior League
Champions: 1901–02, 1902–03
East Derbyshire League
Champions: 1961–62, 1962–63

Cup
Sheffield & Hallamshire Senior Cup
1971–72
Sheffield & Hallamshire Minor Cup
1891–92
Sheffield & Hallamshire Association Cup
2004–05, 2005–06
Aston-cum-Aughton Charity Cup
1902–03, 1903–04, 1904–05, 1906–07, 1907–08
Portland/Worksop Senior Cup
1903–04, 1908–09, 1913–14, 1920–21, 1922–23, 1923–24, 1953–54
East Derbyshire League Cup 
1960–61, 1961–62, 1962–63

Records
Best League performance: 3rd, Yorkshire League, 1968–69
Best FA Cup performance: 3rd Qualifying Round, 1921–22
Best FA Amateur Cup performance: 2nd Qualifying Round, 1946–47
Best FA Vase performance: 4th Round, 1980–81
Record attendance: 2,500 vs Bramley Sunnyside, Whitlam Memorial Cup final, 1961–62

References

External links
Official website

Football clubs in England
Football clubs in South Yorkshire
Association football clubs established in 1881
1881 establishments in England
Sport in South Yorkshire
Sheffield & Hallamshire County FA members
Sheffield & District Football League
Hatchard League
Sheffield Association League
Yorkshire Football League
Northern Counties East Football League
Central Midlands Football League
Sheffield & Hallamshire County Senior Football League
Sheffield Amateur League
Mining association football teams in England